Olga Komyagina (born 10 February 1974) is a Russian middle distance runner who specializes in the 1500 metres. She gained fame acting as a pacemaker/rabbit in races, and is widely considered to be the best pacemaker in the history of athletics.

Achievements

Personal bests
800 metres – 2:00.64 min (1999)
1500 metres – 4:02.32 min (2000)
Mile run – 4:25.71 min (1999), indoor: 4:23.49 min (2008)
3000 metres – 8:42.58 min (1999), indoor: 8:35.67 min (2006)

External links 

1974 births
Living people
Russian female middle-distance runners
Russian female long-distance runners